The year 1871 in architecture involved some significant events.

Events
 Abraham Hirsch is appointed chief architect of the French city of Lyon.
 Martin & Chamberlain are appointed architects for the Birmingham board schools in England.
 (end of year) – At the Vienna Hofburg, groundbreaking is held for the new Imperial Natural History Museum, beginning a 20-year construction project.

Buildings and structures

Buildings opened

 March 29 – The Royal Albert Hall in London, designed by Francis Fowke and H. Y. Darracott Scott.
 September 14 – Hokkaidō Shrine, Sapporo, Japan.
 September 27 – Rochdale Town Hall, England, designed by William Henry Crossland.
 October 15 – Church of the Holy Name of Jesus, Manchester, England, designed by Joseph A. Hansom & Son.

Buildings completed
 Alexandria City Hall, Virginia, USA, designed by Adolph Cluss
 Christ Church, Nazareth, Israel
 Church of Saint-Augustin, Paris, designed by Victor Baltard
 Fort Teremba, New Caledonia
 Jacob Kamm House, Portland, Oregon, USA, designed by Justus F. Krumbein
 Lehrter Bahnhof, Berlin, designed by Alfred Lent, Bertold Scholz and Gottlieb Henri Lapierre.

Awards
 RIBA Royal Gold Medal – James Fergusson
 Grand Prix de Rome, architecture: .

Births

 April 12 – August Endell, German Jugendstil architect and designer (died 1925)
 August 22 – Émile André, French architect, artist and furniture designer (died 1933)
 September 10 – Thomas Adams, British urban planner (died 1940)

Deaths
 January 4 – Lewis Vulliamy, English architect (born 1791)
 September 1 – Sir James Pennethorne, English architect and planner (born 1801)
 October 9 – Niels Sigfred Nebelong, Danish historicist architect (born 1806)

References

Architecture
Years in architecture
19th-century architecture